Simon (8th century) was ruler of the Nubian kingdom of Makuria.

According to Severus of El Ashmunein, Zacharias declined the kingship when his father Merkurios died, and appointed his kinsman Simon to server instead, so he could devote himself to a religious calling.1 After an unspecified period of time Simon died, and Zacharias appointed Abraham to succeed him.

Notes 
 B. Evetts, History of the Patriarchs of the Coptic Church of Alexandria, Part 3 (1910)

Nubian people
Kingdom of Makuria
8th-century monarchs in Africa